Martinjak is a village southeast of Cerknica, below Mount Slivnica in the Inner Carniola region of Slovenia.

The local church in the settlement is dedicated to Saint Vitus and belongs to the Parish of Cerknica. It was first mentioned in written sources dating to 1581. The wooden ceiling in the church dates to 1621. The current belfry was built between 1936 and 1938.

Gallery

References

External links

Martinjak on Geopedia

Populated places in the Municipality of Cerknica